The 1st Georgia Infantry Regiment was an infantry regiment in the Confederate States Army during the American Civil War. Differing from 1st (Ramsey's) Infantry and 1st (Mercer's-Olmstead's) Infantry Regiments; it was also known as the 1st Georgia Regulars.

History
The regiment was organized at Macon, Georgia in April 1861. The companies first named were twelve months' troops, a majority re-enlisting for the war, while others were mustered out when the twelve months expired. The regimental commander, Col. Charles J. Williams, died on February 8, 1862. Now led by Col. William J. Magill, the regiment served in the Army of Northern Virginia in the Eastern Theater of the American Civil War. When Magill was wounded at Antietam, being part of Gen. G.T. Anderson's brigade, the command developed to Cpt. Richard A. Wayne. The 1st Georgia was transferred to the Department of South Carolina, Georgia and Florida in early 1863.  In Gen. George P. Harrison's brigade it participated in the Battle of Olustee. When Magill retired on September 3, 1864, Wayne was named as his successor. The regiment was surrendered along with Joseph E. Johnston's army at Bennett Place in North Carolina on April 26, 1865.

Companies
 A Company - (reformed as Hamilton's battery in July 1862)
 A Company - Georgia Regulars
 B Company - Emmett Rifles
 C Company
 D Company - (reformed as Maxwell's Battery in 1862)
 E Company 
 F Company 
 G Company - Brunswick Defenders
 H Company
 I Company
 K Company
 L Company - Atlanta Greys / Fulton Greys
 M Company

Battles
The regiment fought in the Seven Days Battles, the culmination of the Peninsula campaign (June 25-July 1, 1862), Battle of Savage's Station (June 29), Second Battle of Manassas (Bull Run, August 28-29), Battle of Sharpsburg (Antietam, September 17), Battle of Fredericksburg (December 13), Battle of Chickamauga (September 18, 1863), Battle of Chattanooga (November 23-25), Battle of Olustee (February 20, 1864), Battle of Nashville (December 15), Siege of Savannah (December), Carolinas campaign (January – March, 1865), Battle of Bentonville (March 19 -21), and surrendered April 26, 1865, with the Army of Tennessee.

See also
 List of Civil War regiments from Georgia
 Georgia in the American Civil War

References

Units and formations of the Confederate States Army from Georgia (U.S. state)
1861 establishments in Georgia (U.S. state)